CCNU can refer to:

 Cyclin U, a human gene that now has an official symbol of CCNO
 Lomustine, a chemotherapeutic agent
Central China Normal University, a Chinese Ministry of Education university in Wuhan, China.